Clive Sherlock is a British doctor who trained in cognitive behavioural therapy and Jungian psychoanalysis during postgraduate studies at Oxford. He saw limitations in the theories and uses of psychotherapy, cognitive behavioural therapy and psychotropic medication, recognising that we do not understand the nature and cause of conditions such as clinical depression, anxiety, anger and stress, which is why experts are still searching for ways of treating them. As well as studies and work in conventional medicine and psychology he also made a specialised study of far eastern psychology and philosophy, particularly that of Buddhism, and in 1975 he introduced meditation as part of a structured training programme for people facing anything from mild to the most severe psychological and emotional difficulties. These included bipolar, major depression, anxiety, panic, obsessive-compulsive disorder and eating disorders.

He called this approach Adaptation Practice. By Adaptation he means a psychological process that changes our attitudes, habitual responses and outward behaviour to be in harmony with the requirements of any situation we are in. Adaptation requires fundamental changes in how we react to underlying emotions that give rise to psychological problems and that impede or obstruct optimal performance in day-to-day activities, in relationships, at home and at work.  Adaptation therefore affects motivation and cooperation. Adaptation results in changes in the nature of emotion before emotion gives rise to changes in the mind. For example, tense and impelling thoughts, worries and ruminations, and distorted perceptions and memories, all driven by the emotion and therefore part of the syndromes of depression, anxiety, anger or stress.

Adaptation Practice teaches daily life practice as fundamental to the training. Studies have shown the effects of this in Adaptation Practice. Sitting meditation is then introduced, based on daily life practice. The Practice works with the physical aspects of emotion and can be recommended for people who are currently suffering from any emotional difficulties, including severe depression, bipolar, anxiety, anger and stress.

Sherlock first taught Adaptation Practice to people coming to the Oxford University Clinic with treatment-resistant depression and anxiety in 1977. It soon became apparent that it helped people with any problem that involved how they felt, such as: depression, anxiety, anger, stress, obsessive-compulsive disorder and eating disorders. As well as this Adaptation Practice is taken up by professionals, business executives, professional athletes and performing artists to enhance their performance in their special fields. He has continued to teach Adaptation Practice to people with a wide range of conditions and difficulties, from all walks of life and from different cultural, religious, political and philosophical backgrounds. He also trains doctors, psychologists and neuroscientists to teach Adaptation Practice. In 1985 he started teaching Adaptation Practice by distance learning internationally: email, telephone and more recently by Skype.

Having studied medicine in London at Charing Cross Hospital Medical School, Imperial College, London, UK, and worked for three years in teaching hospitals he went to Heidelberg University to study philosophy under Professor Ernst Tugendhat. On his return to the UK he started his studies of the psychology and philosophy of monastic Zen under Venerable Myokyo-ni, shortly before starting postgraduate training in psychiatry and psychology in London under Professor Steven Hirsch at Charing Cross Hospital. While in London he trained in behaviour therapy with Dr Robert Liberman and then continued his training at Oxford University departments of psychiatry and psychology under Professor Michael Gelder. At Oxford Sherlock trained in cognitive behavioural therapy and in Jungian analytical psychotherapy with Dr Anthony Storr.

In 1999 The Times newspaper published a feature article on Adaptation Practice.

Sherlock has published articles on Western and Eastern philosophy and psychology related to A. N. Whitehead's process philosophy and is a founding member of the Whitehead Psychology Nexus, a web-based research group bridging East-West psychologies and philosophies. He taught Buddhist psychology and philosophy for a number of years at The Buddhist Society in London and has written articles for The Buddhist Society’s journal The Middle Way.

Publications

A New Psychological Model of the Psyche with Special Relevance to Depression, Anxiety, Anger, and Stress by Clive Sherlock: presented at the 4th International Conference on Philosophy and Psychiatry in Florence August 2000.

References

External links
AP: Adaptation Practice

Zen Buddhist spiritual teachers
Living people
20th-century British medical doctors
Year of birth missing (living people)